Barnamentanarheiðursløn Tórshavnar býráðs is a Faroese cultural prize, which is given by the City Council of Tórshavn to a Faroese writer, artist, musician, orchestra etc. who the board wish to award for their artistic work with children. The prize was earlier called Barnabókaheiðursløn Tórshavnar býráðs, but in 2010 the rules were changed and the title of the award was changed; the word bók (book) was changed to mentan (culture) in order not to exclude people who are not writers, but still have done a great cultural work for Faroese children.

List of recipients of the Children's Cultural Prize of Tórshavn City Council 
These persons and companies have received the award Barnamentanarheiðursløn Tórshavnar býráðs since it started in 1976:
 2020 Marjun Syderbø Kjelnæs and Rakel Helmsdal
 2019 Bergur Rasmussen
 2018 Vár Berghamar Jacobsen
 2017 Hjálmar Dam and Hanna Flóvinsdóttir
 2016 Joan Sørinardóttir for her book Hvannpoppkorn og summardáafruktsalat
 2016 Beinta Johannesen for her work making interesting material for children at the publishing house Bókadeild Føroya Lærarafelags
 2015 No prize given
 2014 Elin á Rógvi
2013 Rakel Helmsdal
2013 Hilmar Joensen
2012 Hjørdis Johansen, for her theatrical work with children in Dramaverkstaðið in Tórshavn.
2011 Føroya Symfoniorkestur
2010 Jensina Olsen for her musical and theatrical work with and for children.
2010 Janus á Húsagarði for his books Mosamolis and Mosalisa.
2009 Dánjal á Neystabø
2009 Búi Dam
 2008 Marjun Syderbø Kjelnæs
 2008 Hanni Bjartalíð
 2007 Bárður Oskarsson
 2006 Steintór Rasmussen
 2005 Theodor Hansen
 2005 Grafik Studio with Ingi Joensen
 2004 No prize given
 2003 Alexandur Kristiansen
 2002 Sólrún Michelsen
 2001 Maud Heinesen for her books for children
2000 Effie Campbell
1999 Eli Smith
1998 Lydia Didriksen
1998 Knút Olsen
1997 Gríma (Faroese Theatre Group)
1996 Rakel Helmsdal for her book Tey kalla meg bara Hugo.
1995 Edward Fuglø
1994 Ella Smith Clementsen
1994 Niels Jákup Thomsen
1993 Jóhannus á Rógvu Joensen
1993 Dansifelagið í Havn (Faroese Chain Dance Association in Tórshavn) with Sonja Danielsen og Tórhild Justinussen
1992 No prize given
1991 Bjørg Matras Jensen
1990 Olivur við Neyst
1990 Elin Mortensen
1989 Óli Petersen
1989 Jákup Berg
1988 Oddvør Johansen
1987 Pauli Nielsen
1986 Dropin (publishing company)
1986 Nýlendi (publishing company)
1985 Marius Johannesen
1985 Steinbjørn B. Jacobsen
1984 Ebba Hentze
1984 Elin Súsanna Jacobsen
1984 William Heinesen
1983 Guðrun Gaard
1983 Alexandur Kristiansen
1982 Petur Andreassen
1982 Christian Høj
1981 Martin Næs og Martin Joensen
1980 Heðin Brú
1979 Óli Dahl
1979 Andreas Andreasen
1978 Marianna Debes Dahl for her book Burtur á heiði
1977 Sigurð Joensen for his books Gráa dunna, Kálvamuan, Lambamæið
1976 Steinbjørn B. Jacobsen

See also 

Faroese Literature Prize
Faroese Cultural Prize

References 

Faroese literature
Faroese culture
Awards established in 1976
Faroese literary awards
Children's literary awards